Joy Smithers (born 15 July 1963) is an Australian actress, best known for her acting performances on television, and her role as a television news presenter, such as with MTV Australia in the late 1980s.

Her credits include: All The Way, Bangkok Hilton, The Flying Doctors, Home and Away, Lorca and the Outlaws, Wildside and All Saints. For a short time she was co-host of Good Morning Australia. In September 2008 Smithers made a return to acting, as Bridget Simmons in Home and Away.

Smithers appeared in the 2008 Australian surfing film Newcastle, as well as the 2015 action film Mad Max: Fury Road. At the age of 15, Smithers was offered the role of Max Rockatansky's wife, Jessie, in the original 1979 Mad Max, but was forced to decline after her parents would not let her travel to Adelaide for production.

Filmography

FILM

TELEVISION

References

External links
 

1963 births
Australian television actresses
Australian television presenters
Australian women television presenters
Living people